Biblia Hebraica refers primarily to the three editions of the Hebrew Bible edited by Rudolf Kittel. When referenced, Kittel's Biblia Hebraica is usually abbreviated BH, or BHK (K for Kittel). When specific editions are referred to, BH1, BH2 and BH3 are used. Biblia Hebraica is a Latin phrase meaning Hebrew Bible, traditionally used as a title for printed editions of the Tanakh. Less commonly, Biblia Hebraica may also refer to subsequent editions in the Biblia Hebraica series which build on the work of Kittel's editions.

Editions by Kittel
The Old Testament scholar Rudolf Kittel from Leipzig started to develop a critical edition of the Hebrew Bible in 1901, which would later become the first of its kind. His first edition Biblia Hebraica edidit Rudolf Kittel was published as a two-volume work in 1906 under the publisher J. C. Hinrichs in Leipzig.

The second edition of Kittel's Biblia Hebraica appeared in 1913.

BH3 appeared in installments, from 1929 to 1937, with the first one-volume edition in 1937. Some of the references in the textual apparatus reference manuscripts that no longer exist due to the bombing of Leipzig during World War II.

Subsequent editions 
The third edition was superseded by the Biblia Hebraica Stuttgartensia, which appeared in installments from 1968 to 1976 and as a single volume in 1977. The current project in this tradition is the Biblia Hebraica Quinta, which started in 2004.

See also 
 List of Hebrew Bible manuscripts

References

External links 
 Biblia Hebraica (1st ed.) on archive.org Vol I Vol II

1906 non-fiction books
1913 non-fiction books
1937 non-fiction books
Hebrew Bible versions and translations